Lahiru Perera (born 18 April 1984) also known by his stage name La Signore is a Sri Lankan singer, musician and music producer who came to limelight with his 2008 breakthrough Hit single "Rambari". He was born and raised in Kehelbaddara, Udugampola.

His latest ventures include a perfume line named  La Signore The Fragrance perfumes and colognes.

Single song tracks released

References

External links
  official Telegram Channel
 Official La Signore YouTube channel
 
 
 ළහිරු පෙරේරාගෙන් කෙළින්ම අහමු
 දැන් මා ගයන්නේ අර්ථයක් ඇති ගීතයි

21st-century Sri Lankan male singers
1984 births
Living people
Sinhalese singers